The National Movement for the Liberation of Azawad or the Azawad National Liberation Movement (MNLA), formerly the National Movement of Azawad (MNA), is a political and military organisation based in Azawad in northern Mali.

The movement is mostly made up of ethnic Tuareg, some of whom are believed to have fought in the Libyan army during the 2011 Libyan Civil War (though other Tuareg MNLA fighters were on the side of the National Transitional Council and returned to Mali after that war). The movement was founded in October 2011 and had stated that it includes other Saharan peoples.

The Malian government has accused the movement of having links to Al-Qaeda in the Islamic Maghreb. The MNLA denies this claim. By 1 April 2012 the MNLA and Ansar Dine were in control of virtually all of northern Mali, including its three largest cities of Kidal, Gao, and Timbuktu. Tensions between the MNLA and Ansar Dine culminated in the Battle of Gao, in which the MNLA lost control of northern Malian cities to Ansar Dine and the Movement for Oneness and Jihad in West Africa.

History

Since 1916 there have been at least five Tuareg rebellions. After the failure of the 2007–2009 rebellion in northern Niger and Mali, some Tuareg fighters left for Libya where they were integrated into the Libyan Army. At the end of 2011, following the defeat of Libyan Arab Jamahiriya several Tuareg from the Libyan Army and the rebel National Transitional Council returned to the Azawad regions of northern Mali. Many fighters returned from Libya for either financial reasons, such as losing their savings, or due to the alleged racism of NTC fighters and militias.

The MNLA was said to have been formed after a fusion of such groups as the Northern Mali Tuareg Movement. An alleged influx of arms intended for rebels in Libya led to a huge cache in the largely ungoverned desert areas around where the Tuareg live and causing concern that much of the heavy weaponry remains unaccounted for and could be sold to the highest bidder.

Though some analysis has denied the connections to either Al Qaeda in the Islamic Maghreb (AQIM) or Muammar Gaddafi and the Libyan Civil War, although the potency of this rebellion was still read as being influenced from weapons from Libya, as well as leftovers from previous rebellions in Azawad and even from Mali's army which were taken by defecting Arab and Tuareg personnel.

The group is considered to be secular. The Tuareg fighters within the ranks of the National Movement for the Liberation of Azawad have been considered former allies of Muammar Gaddafi which may have organized after the Tuareg Rebellion between 2007 and 2009.

They have also been accused by the government of Mali of cooperating with AQIM. The MNLA have denied this claim.

The MNLA was founded in October 2011; though it is sometimes considered to have been founded more than a year earlier in relation to other such groups. The MNLA have presented themselves as a movement for the liberation of all the peoples of Azawad (Songhai, Arab, Fula and Tuareg). There were also rumours that the group has been supported by battle-hardened Tuaregs from Niger. On the subject of its composition, the MNLA has declared:

Factionalism
The MNLA was rumoured to have factionalised, according to the sources in the Malian government, with the Islamist Ansar Dine claiming control of the region after the capture of several cities, previously attributed to the MNLA. Though the international media has linked the MNLA to Ansar Dine and AQIM, the MNLA has distanced itself from both groups, stating that their sole goal is the independence of Azawad. However, after the fall of Timbuktu it said that Azawad would be governed along with Ansar Dine. On 26 May, the MNLA and Ansar Dine announced a pact in which they would merge to form an Islamist state, renamed the Islamic Republic of Azawad.

Independence fight

MNLA launched its armed campaign in January 2012 to free three regions of Mali from the central government's control and seeking the independence of Azawad.

In January, its fighters attacked Andéramboukane, Ménaka, Tessalit, Niafunke, and Aguelhoc. They were reported to be in control of parts of northern Mali, such as Menaka on 1 February. During that time the movement was said to have opened a fifth front in the town of Lere. At the end of January, they claimed to have shot down a Malian Air Force Mig-21 with the surface-to-air missiles acquired from NATO arms drops over Libya. The military of Mali have also used helicopter gunships to target the group.

On 4 February 2012, the movement's fighters attacked government forces in Kidal with the aim of taking control of the town and occupying the two military bases there. Further towns were seized and re-seized over the course of February and March. At the same time, following clashes in the north, Tuareg civilians were said to have left Bamako for fear of reprisals. The International Committee of the Red Cross also said that 3,500 people had fled across the border to Mauritania and that 10,000 people had crossed into Niger during the clashes.

On 8 February 2012, Tinzawaten was wrested from central government control after Malian troops took a "tactical withdrawal" following the death of one soldier and injuries to two other soldiers, amid calls by the United Nations for a halt to the offensive. One rebel was also killed and another was wounded, while the MNLA seized two military bases and the weapons storages there. The ICRC added that there were 30,000 internally displaced persons, while the UN said that over 20,000 people have fled to Burkina Faso, Algeria and Mauritania. The United Nations also warned of food shortages as a result of the fighting. The UN refugee agency estimated 22,000 people had been displaced in February.

The Economic Community of West African States (ECOWAS) planned to send a team to investigate the violence. It also condemned their actions and called for logistical support for Mali. After the March coup d'etat the MNLA, as well as Ansar Dine, took control of several small towns and also the bigger cities of Kidal, Gao, and Timbuktu. Timbuktu was read by Reuters of being the culmination of the plan to capture northern Mali. The MNLA announced that by taking Timbuktu it sought to "dislodge Mali's remaining political and military administration" in the region and said that it would rule the region with Ansar Dine in opposition to the administration in Bamako.

On 6 April, in an interview with France 24, an MNLA spokesman declared the independence of Azawad as an independent state and said the movement would act as a provisional administration until the establishment of a government.

In the same interview, Attaher also promised that Azawad would "respect all the colonial frontiers that separate Azawad from its neighbours" and insisted that Azawad's declaration of independence has "some international legality". Two days following the declaration of independence, the Arab-dominated National Liberation Front of Azawad (FLNA) were formed to defend Timbuktu from alleged Tuareg domination.

Conflict with Islamist groups

Although both the MNLA and the various Islamist groups fought against a common foe (the Malian government) in the beginning of the conflict, there were deep ideological differences between them. The goal of the MNLA, to establish a secular and independent state of Azawad out of Northern Mali, contrasted sharply with the aims of the Islamist groups, who wanted a united Mali under Sharia law. Once the Malian government's forces had been evicted the region, the two ideological camps began to turn against each other.

On 26 May, the MNLA and Ansar Dine announced a pact in which they would merge to form an Islamist state. However, some later reports indicated the MNLA had decided to withdraw from the pact, distancing itself from Ansar Dine.

On 26 June 2012, the tension came to all-out combat in Gao between the MNLA and the Movement for Oneness and Jihad in West Africa (MOJWA), with both sides firing heavy weapons. MNLA Secretary General Bilal ag Acherif was wounded in the battle. The MNLA were soon driven from the city, and from Kidal and Timbuktu shortly after. However, the MNLA stated that it continued to maintain forces and control some rural areas in the region. The following day, Ansar Dine announced that it was in control of all the cities of northern Mali.

At first, the MNLA retained control of the city of Ménaka, with hundreds of people taking refuge in the city from the rule of the Islamists, and the city of  near the Algerian border. In the same month, a splinter group broke off from the MNLA; calling itself the Front for the Liberation of the Azawad (FPA), stating that Tuareg independence was no longer a realistic goal and that they must concentrate on fighting the Islamists.

On 16 November 2012, MNLA forces launched an offensive against Gao in an attempt to retake the town. However, by the end of the day, the Tuaregs were beaten back by the MOJWA forces after the Islamists laid an ambush for them. On 19 November 2012, MOJWA and AQIM forces took over Ménaka from the MNLA.

On 14 January 2013, after the French intervention in the conflict had commenced, the MNLA declared it would fight alongside the French and even the Malian government to "end terrorism in Azawad". At the same time the MNLA warned the Malian forces not to enter territories it considered its own before an autonomy agreement was signed. The spokesman also declared that the MNLA would be a more effective force than those of the neighboring West African nations "because of our knowledge of the ground and the populations".

Return of Malian troops to Azawad
Following the French intervention in Mali, Malian troops and the MNLA signed a peace agreement. This allowed for Malian troops to return to such cities as Kidal. There were still reports of conflict between those who supported the presence of the 200 Malian soldiers at a local barracks and those that supported the MNLA, who sought to keep Malian soldiers out. Kidal's Deputy Mayor Abda Ag Kazina said: "The Malian army arrived in Kidal. There were two demonstrations, one was to support the army and the other was to prevent the army from returning. There were shots fired in the air and the protesters dispersed."

On 28 November 2013, after a few hundreds Tuareg protesters were violently confronted by Malian soldiers over the visit of Malian Prime Minister Oumar Tatam Ly to MNLA-controlled Kidal, one of the MNLA founders, Attaye Ag Mohamed, said: "The political and military wings of the Azawad declare the lifting of the ceasefire with the central government in Bamako. All our military positions are on alert."

Organisation

Leadership
One of the founding leaders was said to be Moussa Ag Acharatoumane. Another influential leader in the group was Ibrahim Ag Bahanga (as well as his father-in-law Hama Ag Sid'Ahmed, who was also a spokesman for a group in the previous rebellion) from the 1990 and 2006 rebellions. After he was defeated and forced into exile in Libya, he was said to have met with other leaders of the 1990 rebellion who had taken up posts in a new unit of the Libyan army to fight desert warfare. Ibrahim sought to have a proficient force to fight against the Malian state and outside the media spotlight. He was killed on 26 August 2011.

One of the officers he had met in Libya was Colonel Ag Mohamed Najem, who is said by the movement to be the head of its military wing. He is of Malian origin but resigned from the Libyan Army shortly after the uprising to join the Tuareg rebellion in Mali. Colonel Dilal Ag Alsherif is another military leader of the movement.

There are said to be about 40 officers in the MNLA movement. There are also deserters from the Malian Army, including officers. Colonel Nagim is one such officer, who led the charge to capture two cities. The General Secretary of the movement is Bilal Ag Acherif. The spokesman for the MNLA's political wing is Hama Ag Mahmoud. Following the independence declaration, Mahmoud Ag Aghaly was appointed as the head of the interim Executive Committee of the MNLA that was said to govern Azawad.

Armed forces and equipment
Following their victory over the Malian army, the MNLA established their main base at the airport of Gao where they had stocked 30 functional tanks and 10 being repaired. An unnamed commander of the MNLA said that at the beginning they were mainly armed from weapons brought by fighters returning from Libya, but that later of their equipment was seized from the Malian army.

Split-off
Ibrahim Ag Mohamed Assaleh, a former external relations representative of the MNLA, split off from the party in March 2014 and formed the Coalition for the People of Azawad. He was said to be frustrated at the hardline negotiations position Bilal Ag Acherif took when dealing with the Malian government.

References

External links
 

Azawad
Guerrilla organizations
National liberation armies
National liberation movements
Organizations established in 2011
Political movements in Mali
Rebel groups in Mali
Secularism
Tuareg rebels
Tuareg independence movement